Nonlabens dokdonensis is a Gram-negative, non-spore-forming, rod-shaped and non-motile bacterium from the genus of Nonlabens which has been isolated from sea water.

References

Flavobacteria
Bacteria described in 2006